Among the memorials to Martin Van Buren, the 8th president of the United States, are the following:

Homes
Van Buren's home in Kinderhook, New York, which he called Lindenwald, is now the Martin Van Buren National Historic Site.  Lindenwald remained a privately owned residence, and eventually passed out of the hands of the Van Buren family.  It was declared a National Historic Landmark in 1961, and was established as a National Historic Site under the care of the National Park Service in 1974.

In 1936, the New York State Education Department installed a commemorative plaque at 90 State Street in Albany, the site of Van Buren's residence during his service as governor of New York.

Counties
Counties are named for Martin Van Buren in Michigan, Iowa, Arkansas, and Tennessee.  Cass County, Missouri was originally named for Van Buren, and was renamed in 1849 to honor Lewis Cass because Missouri allowed slavery, and Van Buren had opposed slavery as the presidential candidate of the Free Soil Party in 1848.

Cities and towns
Cities and towns named for Van Buren include:

Arkansas
Van Buren, Arkansas

Indiana
Van Buren, Indiana
Van Buren Township, Clay County, Indiana
Van Buren Township, Brown County, Indiana
Van Buren Township, Monroe County, Indiana
Van Buren Township, Grant County, Indiana
Van Buren Township, Pulaski County, Indiana
Van Buren Township, Fountain County, Indiana
Van Buren Township, LaGrange County, Indiana
Van Buren Township, Madison County, Indiana
Van Buren Township, Kosciusko County, Indiana
Van Buren Township, Daviess County, Indiana
Van Buren Township, Shelby County, Indiana
In addition, Van Buren Township in LaPorte County, Indiana was later merged with Noble Township.

Iowa
Van Buren Township, Jackson County, Iowa; Van Buren Township, Lee County, Iowa

Kentucky
Van Buren, Anderson County. This small community was abandoned due to the construction and flooding of Taylorsville Lake from 1974 to 1983.

Louisiana
Van Buren, Livingston Parish. The original parish seat, it is now abandoned.

Maine
Van Buren, Maine

Michigan
 Van Buren Charter Township, Michigan
 Also,  Martin, Michigan (Allegan County), and the now-defunct village of Martinsville in Sumpter Township were named for him.

Missouri
Van Buren, Missouri

Minnesota
Van Buren Township, St. Louis County, Minnesota

Mississippi
Van Buren, Mississippi (defunct)

New York
Van Buren, New York

Ohio
Van Buren (a village in Hancock County)
Van Buren Township, Shelby County, Ohio.  This township started to be populated by white settlers in the early 1830s.  It was incorporated in 1835, and its government organized in 1841.
Van Buren Township, Putnam County, Ohio.  Originally part of Blanchard Township, it was surveyed in 1821, became home to its first white settlers in 1835, and was organized in 1843.
Van Buren Township, Darke County, Ohio
Van Buren Township, Hancock County, Ohio

Tennessee
Van Buren, Hardeman County (unincorporated)  Established in 1831, this unincorporated populated area is located at the intersection of Van Buren and Lake Hardeman Roads, and shares a ZIP code with Hickory Valley.

Wisconsin
Van Buren, Grant County  In 1841 this unincorporated area was combined with unincorporated areas named for Lafayette and Osceola to form the incorporated town of Potosi.

State parks
Van Buren State Park and Van Buren Trail State Park in Michigan, and Ohio's Van Buren State Park and its Van Buren Lake are named for him.

Mountains
Mount Van Buren on the Palmer Land portion of Antarctica was named for Martin Van Buren.

Islands
Van Buren Island in the St. Lawrence River, part of the Thousand Islands, sits at latitude 44.404339N, 75.892119W. Though named for the U.S. President, this island is in Canadian waters.

Ships
USS Van Buren, a United States Navy schooner in service from 1839 to 1847 was also named for Martin Van Buren.

Schools
 Van Buren Elementary School, located in Groves, Texas. Part of the Port Neches-Groves Independent School District. 
 Martin Van Buren High School, Queens Village, New York
Martin Van Buren Elementary School, located on Van Buren Street in Indio, California.

See also
 Presidential memorials in the United States

References

Cultural depictions of Martin Van Buren
Van Buren, Martin